East Pine Provincial Park is a provincial park in British Columbia, Canada, located east of Chetwynd in the Peace River Block at the junction of the Pine and Murray Rivers.  The park was established in 1982 and is 14.2 hectares in size.

See also
Pine River Breaks Provincial Park

References
East Pine Park
BC Parks webpage

Peace River Regional District
Provincial parks of British Columbia
Peace River Country
1982 establishments in British Columbia
Protected areas established in 1982